This is a list of scheduled monuments in Nottingamshire, a county in England.

In the United Kingdom, a scheduled monument is a "nationally important" archaeological site or historic building that has been given protection against unauthorised change by being placed on a list (or "schedule") by the Secretary of State for Culture, Media and Sport; English Heritage takes the leading role in identifying such sites. Scheduled monuments are defined in the Ancient Monuments and Archaeological Areas Act 1979 and the National Heritage Act 1983. There are about 20,000 Scheduled Monument entries on the list, which is maintained by English Heritage; more than one site can be included in a single entry.

While a scheduled monument can also be recognised as a listed building, English Heritage considers listed building status as a better way of protecting buildings than scheduled monument status. If a monument is considered by English Heritage to "no longer merit scheduling" it can be descheduled.

Nottinghamshire has over 160 scheduled monuments including various Roman, medieval and Civil War sites, buildings and ruins.

References

Scheduled monuments in Nottinghamshire
Archaeological sites in Nottinghamshire
Nottingham-related lists
History of Nottinghamshire
Nottinghamshire scheduled monuments